Henare is a Māori surname, originally an adaptation of the English name Henry. It is also (usually historically) encountered as a given name.

Prominent people with the surname Henare include:
Bryan Henare, rugby league player
George Henare, actor
James Henare (1911–1989), tribal leader
Paul Henare, basketball player
Richard Henare, rugby league player
Robert Henare, rugby league player
Tau Henare (born 1960), politician
Taurekareka Henare (1878–1940), politician

Prominent people with the given name Henare include:
Henare Te Raumoa Huatahi Balneavis, interpreter
Henare Kaihau, Politician
Hēnare Kōhere, soldier
Henare Matua, tribal leader
Henare Potae, tribal leader
Henare Wiremu Taratoa, missionary
Henare Te Atua, tribal leader
Henare Wepiha Te Wainohu, tribal leader
Hēnare Mātene Te Whiwhi, tribal leader
Henare Tomoana, tribal leader
Henare Uru, politician

People with the stage name Henare:
Henare (wrestler), New Zealand professional wrestler

Māori-language surnames